Prorenoate potassium (developmental code name SC-23992) is a synthetic steroidal antimineralocorticoid which was never marketed.

See also
 Prorenoic acid
 Prorenone

References

Abandoned drugs
Antimineralocorticoids
Carboxylic acids
Ketones
Potassium compounds
Pregnanes
Spirolactones
Tertiary alcohols